Babacan is a surname. Notable people with the surname include:

Ali Babacan (born 1967), Turkish politician
Doğan Babacan (1929–2018), Turkish football referee
Halit Haluk Babacan (born 1966), Turkish sailor
Volkan Babacan (born 1988), Turkish football player

Turkish-language surnames
de:Babacan